Kingston Escarpment and Iford Hill is a  biological Site of Special Scientific Interest east of Brighton in East Sussex.

These two areas of steeply sloping chalk grassland have a rich invertebrate fauna, including Adonis blue and small blue butterflies and the nationally rare and specially protected wart-biter grasshopper. The flora is also diverse with plants such as squinancywort, horseshoe vetch and eyebright.

References

Sites of Special Scientific Interest in East Sussex